Trails End is a 1935 American Western film directed by Albert Herman and starring Conway Tearle, Claudia Dell and Fred Kohler. It is based on a story by James Oliver Curwood. It was given a subsequent release by Astor Pictures following World War II.

Cast

References

Bibliography
 Pitts, Michael R. Western Movies: A Guide to 5,105 Feature Films. McFarland, 2012.

External links
 

1935 films
1935 Western (genre) films
American black-and-white films
American Western (genre) films
Films directed by Albert Herman
1930s English-language films
1930s American films